Taiwan Trade Shows (known as "Taipei Trade Shows" before 2012) is a series of trade exhibitions organized by TAITRA in Taipei, Taiwan. It is based on the Taiwan Clothes Export Mart Exhibition first held in September 1974. Currently, TAITRA holds a number of annual "Taiwan Trade Show" exhibitions including COMPUTEX, Taipei Cycle, and TAITRONICS at the Taipei World Trade Center.

List of Taiwan Trade Shows

Current
COMPUTEX Taipei
Fastener Taiwan
FOOD TAIPEI
Foodtech & Pharmatech TAIPEI
Furniture Taipei
Giftionery Taipei
METICARE TAIWAN
Mediphar Taipei
Motorcycle Taiwan
SENCARE
TaiSPO
Taipei Cycle
TaiHerbs
Taipei International Machine Tool Show
TAIPEI PACK
Taipei PLAS
TAITRONICS Series
Autotronics Taipei
TAITRONICS India
TAITRONICS Taipei
TAIWAN BOAT SHOW
HALAL TAIWAN
Laundry Taiwan
TADTE
Taiwan HORECA
TAIWAN SOUVENIR
TIMTOS
YODEX, Young Designers' Exhibition

Suspended
Leisure Taiwan (suspended since 2012)
TICA (Taipei Computer Applications Show, domestic market show, suspended since 2017)
TAITRONICS Series
DigiTronics Taipei (suspended since 2008)
TAITRONICS Bangkok (suspended since 2009)

External links

Recurring events established in 1974
Trade fairs in Taiwan
Economy of Taipei
Economy of Taiwan-related lists